Dauphin County Bridge No. 27, also known as Seaman Bridge, is a historic iron truss bridge spanning Mahantango Creek at Mifflin Township, Dauphin County, Pennsylvania and Lower Mahanoy Township, Northumberland County, Pennsylvania. It has a single span, .  The bridge was constructed in 1896, by the Chambersburg Bridge Company, Chambersburg, Pennsylvania.  The bridge was closed to vehicular traffic in 1978. After petitions from local residents, it was reopened, but closed again to vehicular traffic in 1983 and to pedestrian traffic in 1992 due to deterioration.

It was added to the National Register of Historic Places in 1993.

References

Road bridges on the National Register of Historic Places in Pennsylvania
Bridges completed in 1896
Bridges in Dauphin County, Pennsylvania
Bridges in Northumberland County, Pennsylvania
National Register of Historic Places in Dauphin County, Pennsylvania
Iron bridges in the United States
Truss bridges in the United States